= RNAF =

RNAF may refer to:

- Royal Netherlands Air Force (also RNLAF), the military aviation branch of the Netherlands Armed Forces
- Royal Norwegian Air Force (also RNoAF), the air force of Norway
